Jean Bourgoin (4 March 1913 – 3 September 1991) was a French cinematographer. He won the Academy Award for Best Cinematography for the 1962 war film The Longest Day.

Selected filmography
 The Time of the Cherries (1938)
 La Marseillaise (1938)
 Cristobal's Gold (1940)
 It Happened at the Inn (1943)
 Box of Dreams (1945)
 Sybille's Night (1947)
 Branquignol (1949)
 Justice Is Done (1950)
 Shadow and Light (1951)
 Rue des Saussaies (1951)
 It Happened in Paris (1952)
 We Are All Murderers (1952)
 The House on the Dune (1952)
 Follow That Man (1953)
 Open Letter (1953)
 Before the Deluge (1954)
 Black Dossier (1955)
 The River of Three Junks (1957)
 Goha (1958)
 Mon Oncle (1958)
 Black Orpheus (1959)
 A Mistress for the Summer (1960)
 The Counterfeit Traitor (1962)
 Gigot (1962)
 The Longest Day (1962)
 Germinal (1963)
 Impossible on Saturday (1965)

References

Bibliography
 Langman, Larry. Destination Hollywood: The Influence of Europeans on American Filmmaking. McFarland, 2000.

External links

1913 births
1991 deaths
Best Cinematographer Academy Award winners
Cinematographers from Paris
French expatriates in the United States